Chitrakonda is a Vidhan Sabha constituency of Malkangiri district, Odisha.

This constituency includes Balimela, Khairaput block, Kudumulugumma block, Maithili block and 15 Gram panchayats (Chitapari-III, Chitrakonda, Doraguda, Dudameta, Gunthawada, Kamwada, Kapatuti, Mandapali, Mariwada, Nilakamberu, Nuaguda, Old Chimitapali, Potrel, Tarlakota and Tunnel-Camp) of Korukunda block.

Elected Members

Ten elections were held between 1974 and 2014.
Elected members from the Chitrakonda constituency are:
2019: (147): Purna Chandra Baka (BJD)
2014: (147): Dambaru Sisa (BJD) 
2009: (147): Mamta Madhi (Congress)
2004: (87): Prahallad Dora (BJP)
2000: (87): Mamta Madhi (Congress)
1995: (87): Gangadhar Madhi (Congress)
1990: (87): Prahallad Dora (Janata Dal)
1985: (87): Gangadhar Madhi (Congress)
1980: (87): Gangadhar Madhi (Congress-I)
1977: (87): Prahallad Dora (Janata Party)
1974: (87): Gangadhar Madhi (Congress)

2019 Election Result

2014 Election Result
In 2014 election, Biju Janata Dal candidate Dambaru Sisa defeated Indian National Congress candidate Sunadhar Kakari by a margin of 24,730 votes.

2009 Election Result
In 2009 election, Indian National Congress candidate Mamata Madhi defeated Biju Janata Dal candidate Dambaru Sisa by a margin of 260 votes.

Notes

References

Assembly constituencies of Odisha
Malkangiri district